The World Science Festival is an annual science festival hosted by the World Science Foundation, a 501(c)(3) nonprofit organization based in New York City.  There is also an Asia-Pacific event held in Brisbane, Australia.
 
The foundation's goal is to create a broad public that is 'informed about science, inspired by its wonder, convinced of its value, and willing to consider its impact on the future."

History 
The festival was founded and established by Brian Greene, professor of mathematics and physics at Columbia University and author of several science books (including The Elegant Universe, and The Hidden Reality); and Tracy Day, a four-time National News Emmy Award-winning journalist, who has produced live and documentary programsfor the nation's most prominent television news departments. Greene is now chairman of the World Science Foundation and Day is executive of the World Science Festival.
 
The festival's events are rooted in science, but also meet the production standards of professional television and live theater events. Founding benefactors include the Simons Foundation, the Alfred P. Sloan Foundation, and the John Templeton Foundation.

Board of directors 

 Alan Alda
 Judith Cox
 Tracy Day
 Brian Greene
 Gillian Small
 Tamsen Ann Ziff

The founding benefactors were the Simons Foundation, the Alfred P. Sloan Foundation, and the John Templeton Foundation.

Inaugural festival 

The inaugural festival took place May 28 - June 1, 2008, at 22 venues in New York City. The festival, described by The New York Times as a "new cultural institution," included 46 events, a street festival, and, on the first day, the day-long World Science Summit at Columbia University. Among the more than 150 participants, speakers and artists were 11 Nobel Prize laureates. Venues included the American Museum of Natural History, Abyssinian Baptist Church, and New York University's Skirball Center for the Performing Arts at Gould Plaza. The total audience was more than 120,000.

World Science Festival venues

New York City 
Over the past 10 years, the festival has attracted more than two million visitors, with millions more viewing the programs online. Programming includes discussions, debates, plays, interactive explorations, musical performances, intimate salons and large outdoor events in parks, museums, galleries and performing arts venues throughout New York City. For a complete list of program, visit the festival's official website, launched in 2004.

Brisbane
Since 2016, another event has been held each year in Brisbane, Australia. 
It is organized by Queensland Museum Network, which holds the exclusive license for in the Asia Pacific region from 2016 to 2021.

Past participants 
Past participants have included:

 Alan Alda
 Joshua Bell
 Chuck Close
 Glenn Close
 Sylvia Earle
 Philip Glass
 Maggie Gyllenhaal
 Stephen Hawking
 John Hockenberry
 Bill T. Jones
 Charlie Kaufman
 Mary-Claire King
 Eric Lander
 Richard Leakey
 John Lithgow
 Yo-Yo Ma
 Bobby McFerrin
 Oliver Sacks
 Liev Schreiber
 Anna Deavere Smith
 Julie Taymor
 E.O. Wilson

Nobel Laureates
The following Nobel Laureates have participated:

 David Baltimore
 Barry Barish
 Steven Chu
 David Gross
 Eric Kandel
 Dudley R. Herschbach
 Roald Hoffmann
 Leon Lederman
 Paul Nurse
 John C. Mather
 Saul Perlmutter
 Adam Riess
 F. Sherwood Rowland
 Horst Störmer
 Jack W. Szostak
 Kip Thorne
 Gerard ‘t Hooft
 Harold Varmus
 James Watson
 Steven Weinberg
 Rainer Weiss
 Carl Wieman
 Frank Wilczek

The full list of participants can be found on the festival's official website.

Education 
The World Science Festival maintains educational programs for students and adults around the world in many scientific disciplines.

World Science Scholars 
The prestigious World Science Scholars program allows "high school students with exceptional mathematical talent to be mentored by world-renowned scientists and connect both online and in person with an elite group of peers." Scholars work together on projects, internships, exercises and discussions on topics such as particle physics, computational thinking, astrobiology, and string theory. The free two-year program is funded by the John Templeton Foundation. Previous World Science Scholars have included Brian Greene, Mandë Holford, Miguel Nicolelis, Stephen Wolfram, Cumrun Vafa, and Suzana Herculano-Houzel.

World Science U 
World Science U offers everyone from high school students to adults the opportunity to explore science topics with researchers and educators.

See also

 List of festivals in the United States

References

External links 

 , the festival's official website

2008 establishments in New York (state)
Annual events in New York City
Culture of New York City
Festivals established in 2008
Festivals in New York City
Science and technology in New York City
Science festivals
Science-related YouTube channels